John Derby is an American football player.

John Derby may also refer to:

John Derby (Leicester MP) represented Leicester (UK Parliament constituency)
John Derby (Wallingford MP) for Wallingford (UK Parliament constituency) in 1380s and 1390s
John de Derby, Archdeacon of Barnstaple

See also
John Derby Allcroft, politician
John Darby (disambiguation)